Ignacio Camuñas Solís (born 1 September 1940) is a Spanish politician who served as Deputy Minister of Relations with the Cortes of Spain, without portfolio in 1977.

References

1940 births
Government ministers of Spain
Living people